G. candida  may refer to:
 Gardenia candida, a plant species endemic to Fiji
 Gibberula candida, a very small sea snail species
 Glyphostoma candida, a sea snail species

See also
 Candida (disambiguation)